The prime minister of Czechoslovakia was the head of government of Czechoslovakia, from the creation of the First Czechoslovak Republic in 1918 until the dissolution of the Czech and Slovak Federative Republic on 1 January 1993.

During periods when the post of the president of Czechoslovakia was vacant, the prime minister took on most presidential duties. However, the Czechoslovak constitutions do not define anything like a post of acting president.

Prime ministers of Czechoslovakia (1918–1992)
Political parties

Other factions

Timeline

See also

 List of rulers of Czechs
 List of Bohemian monarchs
 List of rulers of the Protectorate of Bohemia and Moravia
 List of presidents of Czechoslovakia
 President of the Czech Republic
 List of presidents of the Czech Republic
 Prime Minister of the Czech Republic
 List of prime ministers of the Czech Republic
 President of Slovakia
 Prime Minister of Slovakia

References

Czechoslovakia
Government of Czechoslovakia
Lists of political office-holders in Czechoslovakia

Czechoslovakia, Prime Ministers
Czechoslovakia, Prime Ministers